Enzo Robotti (born 13 June 1935) is a former Italian international footballer who played as a defender.

Club career
Robotti was born in Alessandria. During his club career he played for ACF Fiorentina, A.S. Roma and Brescia Calcio.

International career
At international level, Robotti earned 15 caps for the Italy national football team from 1958 to 1965, and participated in the 1962 FIFA World Cup.

External links
Enzo Robotti - International Appearances

1935 births
Living people
People from Alessandria
Italian footballers
Italy international footballers
1962 FIFA World Cup players
Serie A players
Serie C players
S.S.D. Sanremese Calcio players
Juventus F.C. players
ACF Fiorentina players
A.S. Roma players
Brescia Calcio players
Association football defenders
Footballers from Piedmont
Sportspeople from the Province of Alessandria